The 2004 Men's Hockey Hamburg Masters was the tenth edition of the Hamburg Masters, consisting of a series of test matches. It was held in Hamburg, Germany, from 18 to 20 June 2004, and featured four of the top nations in men's field hockey.

Competition format
The tournament featured the national teams of Argentina, Pakistan, South Korea, and the hosts, Germany, competing in a round-robin format, with each team playing each other once. Three points were awarded for a win, one for a draw, and none for a loss.

Officials
The following umpires were appointed by the International Hockey Federation to officiate the tournament:

 Iftikar Ahmed (PAK)
 Christian Bläsch (GER)
 Enzo Caravetta (ARG)
 Kim Kyung-Soo (KOR)
 Raymond O'Connor (IRE)

Results
All times are local (Central European Summer Time).

Pool

Fixtures

Statistics

Final standings

Goalscorers

References

External links
Deutscher Hockey-Bund
Official website

2004
Hamburg Masters
2004 in German sport
Sport in Hamburg
June 2004 sports events in Europe